Mu of Jin may refer to:

Marquis Mu of Jin (died 785 BC)
Emperor Mu of Jin (343–361)